Love is a 2004 Indian Kannada-language romance film written, directed and produced by Rajendra Singh Babu. The film stars Aditya, making his debut, and Rakshita in lead roles, while Mohanlal, Amrish Puri and Kota Srinivasa Rao feature in supporting roles. This was also Mohanlal debut in Kannada. The film features soundtrack composed by Bollywood composer Anu Malik, marking his debut in Kannada cinema. A. R. Rahman's Airtel jingle was featured and reused for another four similar tunes in the film. The film was dubbed and released in Telugu as Prema Nagar and in Malayalam as Aey Taxi.

Plot

The story is about the romantic relationship between Vicky and Ganga that begins from Kashi and then travels to Dubai. Tragedy starts with Jai Jagadish and ends with Saligrama Oberoi. Ganga, who mistakes Vikram to be a womaniser, understands his character when he saves her from a fire accident. They become lovers, but things change when a mysterious woman enters their lives.

Cast
 Aditya as Vikram "Vicky"
 Rakshita as Ganga
 Amrish Puri as Saligrama Oberoi
 Mohanlal as Mohan Nair
 Kota Srinivasa Rao
 Jai Jagadish
 Dharmavarapu Subramanyam
 Vinaya Prasad
 Venu Madhav
 Brahmavar
 Komal Kumar
 Suman Setty
 Pavitra Lokesh
 Vishwajeet Pradhan

Production
Mohanlal made his Kannada cinema debut with the film, as a taxi driver. The film was shot in locations such as Allahabad and Varanasi, a month long shoot was conducted in Dubai from November 2003. Mohanlal joined the film in November in Dubai. The film was written, directed and produced by Rajendra Singh Babu. His son Aditya made his acting debut with the film in the leading role.

Soundtrack

The music of the film was composed by veteran Bollywood music composer Anu Malik, making his debut in Kannada cinema. The makers also used A. R. Rahman's Airtel jingle was featured in the original soundtrack album and reused for another four similar tunes in the movie.

Telugu dubbed version is titled Prema Nagar.

The Malayalam dubbed version was titled Aey Taxi.

Release and reception 
Love was released on 9 July 2004. The film was dubbed and released in Telugu as Prema Nagar and in Malayalam as Hey Taxi.

The reviewer for Deccan Herald called the film "a disappointing fare" and criticized its plot. Of the acting performances, they wrote, "Actingwise, Adithya has put in good efforts. There is nothing much to say about Rakshitha's performance as she has done similar roles earlier. Arun Sagar in the role of Amrish Puri's son is wasted." The reviewer concluded writing, "Camerawork gets noticed particularly in Banaras and Dubai desert scenes. Anu Malik's musical score has nothing new. The only songs by A R Rahman's were good."

References

External links
 

2004 films
2000s Kannada-language films
Indian romance films
Films shot in Dubai
Films directed by Rajendra Singh Babu
Films scored by Anu Malik
Films shot in Uttar Pradesh
2000s romance films